{{Infobox tennis biography
|name                        = Rainer Schüttler
|image                       = Rainer Schüttler - Queen's Club 2011.jpg
|caption                     = Schüttler at the 2011 Queen's Club
|country                     = 
|residence                   = Altstätten, Switzerland
|birth_date                  = 
|birth_place                 = Korbach, West Germany
|height                      = 
|turnedpro                   = 1995
|retired                     = 2012
|plays                       = Right-handed (two-handed backhand)
|careerprizemoney            = $7,407,508
|singlesrecord               = {{tennis record|won=327|lost=337|details=  in Grand Slam, ATP World Tour and Davis Cup main draw matches|small=yes}}
|singlestitles               = 4 
|highestsinglesranking       = No. 5 (26 April 2004)
|AustralianOpenresult        = F (2003)
|FrenchOpenresult            = 4R (2003)
|Wimbledonresult             = SF (2008)
|USOpenresult                = 4R (2003)
|Othertournaments            = yes
|MastersCupresult            = SF (2003)
|Olympicsresult              = 2R (2000, 2008)
|doublesrecord               = 

Rainer Schüttler (born 25 April 1976) is a German former professional tennis player. Schüttler was the runner-up at the 2003 Australian Open and a semifinalist at the 2008 Wimbledon Championships. He won an Olympic silver medal in doubles at the 2004 Athens Olympics, and achieved a career-high ranking of world No. 5 in April 2004.

Early life
He began playing tennis at the age of nine. He resides in Switzerland.

Career

2003-2009
In 2003, Schüttler became the first German since Boris Becker in 1989 to advance to the fourth round at all Grand Slams. He became the first German to reach a Grand Slam final, at the Australian Open, since Michael Stich was the runner-up at Roland Garros in 1996. En route to the final, which he lost in straight sets to Andre Agassi, he defeated Andy Roddick who would end the season as world No 1.

In 2004, Schüttler reached his first career ATP Masters Series final in Monte Carlo by beating Gustavo Kuerten in the first round, Lleyton Hewitt in the third round, Tim Henman in the quarterfinal and Carlos Moyá in the semifinal. In the final, he lost to Guillermo Coria. That week, he would reach a career-high ranking of No. 5. Schüttler won a silver medal for Germany in men's doubles with partner Nicolas Kiefer at the 2004 Summer Olympics in Athens. 2004 was the sixth straight year in which he finished in the ATP top 50.

Schüttler reached his first career semifinal at Wimbledon by beating Santiago Ventura, James Blake, Guillermo García-López, Janko Tipsarević, and Arnaud Clément 6–3, 5–7, 7–6, 6–7, 8–6. His match with Clément was over five hours, completed in two days to reach the semifinals, in which Schuettler saved a match point at 6–5 down in the fifth set. He was defeated by eventual champion Rafael Nadal 1–6, 6–7, 4–6. His achievement was a big surprise, since he entered the tournament ranked 94th and with a streak of 13 consecutive Grand Slam tournaments without making it past the second round.

His 2009 season Schüttler started off at the Chennai Open, beating Prakash Amritraj 6–2, 4–6, 6–1. In the second round, he beat Simon Greul 6–4, 6–2, and in the quarterfinals Björn Phau, 6–2, 7–5. Unfortunately Schuettler had to withdraw from his semifinal match against Somdev Devvarman because of a wrist injury. He also withdrew from the tournament in Sydney. At the Australian Open, he was seeded 30th but lost in the first round to Israeli Dudi Sela 1–6, 6–2, 6–4, 6–4. He also participated in the doubles with Lu Yen-hsun, but they were defeated by Łukasz Kubot and Oliver Marach. In the first round in Rotterdam, he lost to Mario Ančić. He played the Open 13 in Marseille, defeating Laurent Recouderc in the first round 6–1, 6–4.

He competed at the ARAG World Team Cup in Germany, helping his country reach the final, where they lost to Serbia.

In the second round at Wimbledon, though seeded 18th, he was upset by Dudi Sela, 7–6, 6–3, 6–2.

2010-2011
He reached the second round of the Australian Open defeating Sam Querrey in four sets. However he lost to Feliciano López in four sets, too. At the French Open, he again suffered a first-round exit, this time against Guillermo García-López in straight sets. He reached the semifinal of the Aegon Championships at the Queens Club in London but lost to Sam Querrey in three sets 7–6, 5–7, 3–6. Despite his good form he was defeated by Denis Istomin in the second round of Wimbledon in five sets. At the quarterfinal of the Countrywide Classic in Los Angeles, Schüttler could not manage to close out the match against Querrey despite serving for it at 5–4 and 6–5 in the deciding set.
He was knocked out in the first round of the US Open losing to Benoît Paire.
At the Thailand Open in Bangkok, Schüttler beat Ricardo Mello in round one for a second round berth against Ernests Gulbis. He lost 6–7, 7–6, 4–6 in a close match.

In 2010, Schüttler and his former Davis Cup companion Alexander Waske founded the Schüttler Waske Tennis-University, a tennis academy for professional tennis players.

Schüttler started the tour at the Qatar Open where he confronted Teymuraz Gabashvili in the singles, but lost 3–5, 6–7. He also played doubles with Guillermo García-López confronting Marco Chiudinelli and Jo-Wilfried Tsonga, to whom they lost 1–6, 2–6. At the Australian Open, he played ninth seed Fernando Verdasco in the first round, but lost 1–6, 3–6, 2–6. He then played several Challenger series tournaments. At Wimbledon, he defeated Thomaz Bellucci in the first round, but lost to Feliciano López in the second 6–7, 7–6, 2–6, 2–6.

Schüttler officially retired in October 2012.

Significant finals

Olympic final

Doubles: 1 silver medal

Grand Slam finals

Singles: 1 runner-up

Masters Series finals

Singles: 1 runner-up

ATP career finals

Singles: 12 (4 titles, 8 runner-ups)

Doubles: 8 (4 titles, 4 runner-ups)

ATP Challenger and ITF Futures finals

Singles: 14 (6–8)

Doubles: 2 (2–0)

Performance timelines

Singles

Doubles

Top 10 wins

Coaching career
After retirement, he began his coaching career and has coached Janko Tipsarevic, Sergiy Stakhovsky and Vasek Pospisil. Since November 2018, he coached former world No. 1, Angelique Kerber. In July 2019, Kerber announced they had split on social media.

Personal life
In 2014 Rainer met Serbian Jovana Sesevic, whose sister Biljana is married to another former top 10 player, Janko Tipsarevic. They married in 2015 and have two sons (Noah and Leon) and now mostly reside in Switzerland.

References

External links

 Official website 
 
 
 
 Schüttler world ranking history

1976 births
Living people
People from Korbach
Sportspeople from Kassel (region)
German expatriate sportspeople in Switzerland
German male tennis players
German tennis coaches
Olympic silver medalists for Germany
Olympic tennis players of Germany
Tennis players at the 2000 Summer Olympics
Tennis players at the 2004 Summer Olympics
Tennis players at the 2008 Summer Olympics
Olympic medalists in tennis
Medalists at the 2004 Summer Olympics
People from Altstätten
Tennis people from Hesse